Robert Shavlakadze (1 April 1933 – 4 March 2020) was a Georgian high jumper. He competed for the Soviet Union at the 1960 and 1964 Olympics and finished in first and fifth place, respectively. He also won a bronze medal at the 1962 European Championships.

Domestically Shavlakadze won only one Soviet title, in 1964, finishing second in 1959, 1960 and 1962. After retiring from competitions he worked as an athletics coach, in Georgia and Congo. From 1981 to 1993 he was professor of physical education at the Agricultural University of Georgia. Later he became member of the Georgian Olympic Committee.

References

1933 births
2020 deaths
Russian male high jumpers
Soviet male high jumpers
Olympic gold medalists for the Soviet Union
Athletes (track and field) at the 1960 Summer Olympics
Athletes (track and field) at the 1964 Summer Olympics
Olympic athletes of the Soviet Union
Dynamo sports society athletes
European Athletics Championships medalists
Medalists at the 1960 Summer Olympics
Olympic gold medalists in athletics (track and field)

Recipients of the Presidential Order of Excellence